The white-browed crake (Poliolimnas cinereus) is a species of bird in the family Rallidae. It is found in Australia, Brunei, Cambodia, Fiji, Hong Kong, Indonesia, Japan, India, Malaysia, Micronesia, New Caledonia, Palau, Papua New Guinea, the Philippines, Samoa, Singapore, Solomon Islands, Thailand, and Vanuatu.

Its natural habitat is subtropical or tropical mangrove forests. The Iwo Jima rail, a doubtfully valid subspecies formerly native to Iwo Jima, is now extinct.

References

white-browed crake
Birds of Southeast Asia
Birds of Micronesia
Birds of Melanesia
Birds of the Northern Territory
Birds of Queensland
white-browed crake
Taxa named by Louis Jean Pierre Vieillot
Taxonomy articles created by Polbot
Taxobox binomials not recognized by IUCN